Lawtonville Baptist Church is a historic Baptist church located at Estill, Hampton County, South Carolina. It was built in 1911, and is a brick building with a complex pavilion roof.  It features projecting gables, stained glass windows, and a rear entrance that resembles a castle keep in the Late Gothic Revival style. In 1945, the congregation added a Sunday School building to the east of the original church building, and a music building was added in 1962. The church was renovated in 1973.

It was listed on the National Register of Historic Places in 2012.

References

Churches on the National Register of Historic Places in South Carolina
Gothic Revival church buildings in South Carolina
Churches completed in 1911
National Register of Historic Places in Hampton County, South Carolina
Buildings and structures in Hampton County, South Carolina